The Space Between is a feature film written and directed by Travis Fine that premiered at the 2010 Tribeca Film Festival. The film is a fictional account of a flight attendant who finds herself responsible for an unaccompanied minor on the morning of the September 11 attacks. It has won three film awards. It had its U.S. television premiere on the USA Network on Sunday, 11 September 2011, the tenth anniversary of the attacks.

Plot summary
Montine McLeod (Melissa Leo) is a flight attendant who gets stuck with nine-year-old Pakistani-American Omar Hassan (Anthony Keyvan) after their flight from New York City to Los Angeles gets grounded in Longview, Texas on the morning of 11 September 2001. Omar is an unaccompanied minor; in the chaos that ensues, Montine becomes his temporary guardian. Montine later discovers that Omar's father works in the World Trade Center. She decides to drive the boy home after he informs her his father is at home waiting for him in New York. On the journey, they begin to bond and learn more about each other. Montine makes a stop on the way to New York as she receives a call that her mother is dying. Upon arriving at her mother's house, she finds her mother already dead. After dealing with her mother's death, she continues on the road to take Omar home. When they get there, they learn Omar's father has not been home in the two days since the destruction of the Twin Towers. Later that night, Montine receives a call from her employer and is forced to bring Omar with her. At the ensuing meeting, Montine is terminated for the unauthorized trip; Omar is taken from her and given to his school head master for the night before leaving for a new school the following day (the reason he was on the original flight). The day Omar is set to leave for Los Angeles, he locks himself in the bathroom and refuses to come out. Montine is asked to come; she coaxes Omar out of the bathroom and she walks him to his flight to Los Angeles.

Cast
 Melissa Leo as Montine McLeod
 Anthony Keyvan as Omar Hassan
 Brad William Henke as Will
 AnnaSophia Robb as Samantha "Sam" Jean McLeod
 Phillip Rhys as Maliq
 Hunter Parrish as McDonough
 Kyle Bornheimer
 Kelli Williams as Junkie
 Don Franklin as Paul Ehrlich
 Brett Cullen as Used Car Salesman
 Sayed Badreya as Imam

External links
 Movie site
 Review at DVDTalk
 

2010 films
2010s drama road movies
American drama road movies
Films based on the September 11 attacks
2010 drama films
2010s English-language films
2010s American films